Wasim Akram, a former Pakistani cricketer, took 31 five-wicket hauls during his career in international cricket. In cricket, a five-wicket haul (also known as a "five–for" or "fifer") refers to a bowler taking five or more wickets in a single innings. This is regarded as a notable achievement, and as of 2014 only 41 bowlers have taken more than 15 five-wicket hauls at international level in their cricketing careers. A left-arm fast bowler who represented his country between 1984 and 2003, the BBC described Akram as "one of the greatest left-arm bowlers in the history of world cricket", while West Indian batsman Brian Lara said that Akram was "definitely the most outstanding bowler [I] ever faced".

Akram made his Test debut in January 1985, in an innings defeat by New Zealand in Auckland. The following Test, in a man-of-the-match performance, he took ten wickets over the two innings, securing his first two five-wicket hauls but still ended on the losing side. He took another pair of five-wicket hauls in a single match five years later, against Australia at the Melbourne Cricket Ground (MCG). His career-best figures for an innings were 7 wickets for 119 runs against New Zealand in Wellington, in February 1994.

Making his One Day International (ODI) debut in 1984 against New Zealand in Faisalabad, Akram's first ODI five-wicket haul came the following year against Australia in a match which Pakistan won at the MCG. In 1989, he took five wickets in an innings, in a performance that included a hat-trick (three wickets in consecutive deliveries), against the West Indies. His career-best bowling in ODI cricket was 5 wickets for 15 runs against Zimbabwe in Karachi, in December 1993.

Retiring from international cricket in 2003 after nearly 20 years, Akram took 25 five-wicket hauls in Test cricket and 6 in ODIs.  As of 2014, his position in the all-time lists for taking five wickets in an innings the most times is seventh overall in both Tests and ODIs.

Key

Tests

One Day Internationals

References

External links

Akram
Akram, Wasim